"The Bertha Butt Boogie" is a 1975 song by the Jimmy Castor Bunch. It achieved a No. 16 placing on the US pop chart and reached No. 22 on the US R&B chart.  It was also a top 40 hit in Canada.

The record was a follow-up to the band's 1972 top 10 hit "Troglodyte (Cave Man)", which also featured the "Bertha Butt" character, who showed up on several more Jimmy Castor Bunch tracks in following years; it also calls back to two previous Castor recordings, "Hey Leroy Your Mama's Calling You" and "Luther the Anthropoid (Cave Man)", who appear with the troglodyte midway through the song to boogie with the Butt sisters. It has been described by one critic as "another self-defining hit" for the band, and by another as the "seminal narrative" of "celebratory butt songs" in the same vein as similarly themed records such as "Da Butt", "Rump Shaker", and "Baby Got Back".

The song is considered an icon of black music, bringing humor into the larger narrative that emerged in the mid-seventies.

Chart history

References

1975 songs
1975 singles
Atlantic Records singles
Songs about dancing
Songs about fictional female characters